Al R. Johanson (May 28, 1899 – March 30, 1964) was an American lawyer and politician.

Johanson was born in Traverse County, Minnesota and graduated from Wheaton High School in Wheaton, Minnesota. He received his bachelor's degree from University of Minnesota in 1922 and his law degree from University of Minnesota Law School in 1924. He lived with his wife and family in Wheaton, Minnesota and practiced law in Wheaton. Johanson served on the United States Civilian Defense Council and was the Traverse County Chair. He also served as the Mayor of Wheaton, Minnesota. Johanson also served in the Minnesota Senate from 1943 to 1954.

References

1899 births
1964 deaths
People from Traverse County, Minnesota
University of Minnesota alumni
University of Minnesota Law School alumni
Minnesota lawyers
Mayors of places in Minnesota
Minnesota state senators